Badami Bagh railway station (Urdu and ) is located in Badami Bagh, Lahore district, Punjab province, Pakistan.

See also
 List of railway stations in Pakistan
 Pakistan Railways

References

Railway stations in Lahore District
Railway stations on Karachi–Peshawar Line (ML 1)